Cyptocephala elegans is a species of shield bugs in the tribe Pentatomini.

References

External links 
 

Insects described in 1919
Pentatomini